Parliamentary elections were held in Greece on 18 June 1989. The liberal-conservative New Democracy party of Konstantinos Mitsotakis defeated PASOK of Andreas Papandreou. However, New Democracy could not form a government, since its 5% lead in the popular vote was not enough to reach a majority because of the proportional representation system voted into electoral law by the previous PASOK government. An agreement between ND and Synaspismos was made to form a short-term government of "katharsis", with a mandate to clean up the various scandals from the outgoing PASOK government. Tzannis Tzannetakis was chosen as a compromise candidate to become Prime Minister, and an agreement was made that the coalition government would resign in October.

Results

References

Greece
1989 06
Legislative
1989
Greece